Tiger Kirchharz (real name Diana Kirchharz, born January 7, 1985) is a dancer, choreographer and actress.

Biography 

Kirchharz was born in Munich, Germany, and started dancing at the age of four. Her father "baptized" the third of his daughters Tiger after she fell in love with cartoonist Janosch´s Tigerente - and only responded when she has been called Tiger. In addition to ballet classes, she started at the age of 6 years with Hip-hop and Latin dances. In 1999, she began to teach and established two years later her own Dance Company. After her graduation she studied dance at Jessica Iwanson at the Academy for contemporary dance and expanded her ballet, modern, and jazz skills at the Iwanson school. 2009 Tiger built a show called MTV in order to participate at European and World Championships.

Tiger is also active as a choreographer (Winter potato dumplings,  Knights - In search of the ravishing Herzelinde), judge at dance competitions (IDO, TAF, Danish Championship 2013), film actress and model. She is the only European show dancer who starred in Hollywood films like Step Up Revolution (2012) and Step Up: All In (2014).

Championships 
 45 times German Champion in Hip-Hop, Latin dance, Ballroom dance und Discodance, 45 times German Vicechampion 
 2012 World Champion and World Vicechampion Production Show
 2009 World Champion and European Champion in Production Show
 2008 European Champion in Hip-Hop Formation
 2008 European Champion in Hip-Hop Small Group
 2006 Finals in Casting show Dancestar, VIVA Germany starring Detlef Soost
 1999 Winner in Latin dance Hessen tanzt

TV Shows 
 2016  Deutschland tanzt, ProSieben TV Show – Nils Brunkhorst
 2015 Menschen 2015, ZDF – Robin Schulz
 2015 MTV EMA'S  – Pharrell Williams – Milan, Italy.
 2015 Isle of MTV - Omi - Malta
 2013 MTV EMA'S –  Icona Pop – Amsterdam, Netherlands
 2012 MTV EMA'S – Psy / Rita Ora / Pitbull – Frankfurt, Germany
 2012 BRIT Awards – Rihanna – London
 2010 Choreography/dancer in RTL TV Show Nur die Liebe zählt – Munich, Germany
 2009 MTV EMA'S – Shakira – Berlin, Germany.
 2007 MTV EMA'S – will.i.am / Avril Lavigne – Munich, Germany
 1995 Leading actress in short film "Paolo" – Marcus O. Rosenmüller – Greece

Movie

Dance and Actress 
 2017: Bullyparade – Der Film
 2016: Welcome to Germany
 2016: Verrückt nach Fixi
 2014: Step Up: All In
 2012: Step Up: Revolution
 1995: Short film Paolo – Marcus O. Rosenmüller – Greece

Choreography 
 2016: Welcome to Germany
 2016: Zwei Sturköpfe im Dreivierteltakt
 Winterkartoffelknödel
 2008: 1½ Knights – In Search of the Ravishing Princess Herzelinde

Awards 
 TAF Award 2013, The Actiondance Federation (TAF)
 2007 Gold-DVD for "Dance like a Popstar"-DVD

References

External links 

Photobook
MOG Dance Center by Tiger Kirchharz

1985 births
Living people
People from Munich
German female dancers
German choreographers